Mulenga Mpundu Kapwepwe (born 7 October 1958) is a distinguished Zambian author and social activist, born on October 7, 1958. Kapwepwe has garnered widespread recognition for her remarkable contributions in the field of women's history, having co-founded the Zambian Women's History Museum.

Kapwepwe's lineage is also noteworthy, being the daughter of Simon Kapwepwe, a prominent figure in Zambia's political history who served as the country's former vice-president. In addition to her work in preserving and promoting women's history, Kapwepwe is known for her philanthropic efforts, particularly in education.

Kapwepwe has dedicated herself to building libraries in Lusaka, Zambia's capital city, with the aim of providing young children access to education and empowering them to shape their own futures. Her selfless contributions in this regard have garnered significant praise and recognition, making her a prominent figure in Zambia's social and educational landscape.

Career
Kapwepwe began writing her own plays early on in her career with the lack of a formal theater education. As an author, Kapwepwe has written a number of award-winning plays and books. In addition to writing and producing educational materials, short stories and plays, Mulenga has produced videos, television and radio programmes on a number of subjects.

She served as the chairperson of the National Arts Council of Zambia, from 2004 until 2017. She also served as the Patron of a number of associations, including the Women in Visual Arts Association, the Zambian Folk Music and Dance Association, and the Youth For Culture Association. She has been Vice Chairman of the Ukusefya pa Ngwena Cultural Association, Zambia National Visual Arts Council and The Zambia Women Writers Association . Kapwepwe also sits on the Zambia Commission for UNESCO and the Arts Institute of Africa and is the chairperson of the Arterial Network.

Women's History Museum
In 2016, Mulenga Mpundu Kapwepwe collaborated with Samba Yonga to establish the Zambian Museum of Women's History. Initially an online-only project, the museum aimed to collect and display artifacts showcasing the contributions of Zambian women to the country's traditional and contemporary history. The project was launched in partnership with Kvinnohistoriskt Museum, a women's history museum in Sweden.

The initiative is a significant step towards promoting gender equality and increasing the representation of women in historical narratives. Through the Zambian Museum of Women's History, Kapwepwe and Yonga seek to expand the number of narratives on Wikipedia related to Zambian women who have made noteworthy contributions to the country's history.

Their efforts have gained significant recognition, with the project receiving widespread praise for its contributions towards creating a more gender-equal society. With plans to establish a physical location for the museum, Kapwepwe and Yonga are expected to continue making meaningful contributions towards empowering and celebrating the accomplishments of Zambian women.

Awards

She was on the list of the BBC's 100 Women announced on 23 November 2020.

Artistic achievement

Notable books

 Some Bemba Names and Their Meanings – 2002
 Times and Seasons in Bemba - 2003
 Traditional Bemba Dress and Ornament - 2003
 Traditional Bemba Foods And Beverages - 2003

References

External links

 
 Profile of Mulenga Mpundu Kapwepwe At Chalo Chatu Website

1958 births
People from Lusaka
Zambian women writers
21st-century Zambian writers
Living people
BBC 100 Women